Proline-serine-threonine phosphatase-interacting protein 1 is an enzyme that in humans is encoded by the PSTPIP1 gene.

Interactions 

PSTPIP1 has been shown to interact with:

 Abl gene, 
 BZW1, 
 CD2,
 PTPN12, 
 PTPN18,  and
 Wiskott-Aldrich syndrome protein.

See also 
 PAPA syndrome

References

Further reading